The Ellis Formation is a geologic formation of the Ellis Group in Montana.

It preserves fossils dating back to the Jurassic period.

See also

 List of fossiliferous stratigraphic units in Montana
 Paleontology in Montana

References
 

Jurassic Montana